Kosovo has competed in the European Athletics Championships since 2016.

Medal count

See also
Kosovo at the World Athletics Championships
Kosovo at the European Championships

References

Nations at the European Athletics Championships
Kosovo at multi-sport events